Falseunidia albosignata is a species of beetle in the family Cerambycidae, and the only species in the genus Falseunidia. It was described by Breuning in 1943.

References

Desmiphorini
Beetles described in 1943
Monotypic Cerambycidae genera